Márcio Souza da Silva (born January 14, 1980) is a Brazilian footballer. After previously playing for two years in Persela Lamongan, in the 2009/2010 season, he played second-level competition with Semen Padang in Indonesia, when his club won third place and promotion to the Indonesia Super League. On 4 April 2012, he joined Persib Bandung.

On 6 July 2016, Márcio Souza was arrested in Belford Roxo, Rio de Janeiro for match fixing in Brazil.

References

External links
 Profile in Liga Indonesia official website

1980 births
Living people
Brazilian footballers
Footballers from Rio de Janeiro (city)
Expatriate footballers in Indonesia
Liga 1 (Indonesia) players
Persela Lamongan players
Deltras F.C. players
Arema F.C. players
Persib Bandung players
Semen Padang F.C. players
Perseman Manokwari players
Brazilian expatriate footballers
Brazilian expatriate sportspeople in Indonesia
Brazilian expatriate sportspeople in Malaysia
Expatriate footballers in Malaysia
Malaysia Super League players
Terengganu FC players
Association football forwards
People from São João de Meriti